Leptostyrax is an extinct genus of mackerel sharks that lived during the Cretaceous. It contains two valid species, L. macrorhiza and L. stychi, which have been found in North America, Europe, Africa, and Australia.

References

Prehistoric Lamniformes
Prehistoric shark genera
Cretaceous genus first appearances
Cretaceous genus extinctions
Cretaceous sharks
Cretaceous fish of North America